Charlie Ware may refer to:

Charlie Ware (hurler, born 1900), Irish hurler
Charles "Charlie" Ware (1914–1999), African-American victim of racial violence
Charlie Ware (footballer) (1931–2017), English professional footballer
Charlie Ware (hurler, born 1933), Irish hurler